Reams is a surname. Notable people with the surname include:

Barbara Jane Reams (born 1976), American actress
Frazier Reams (1897–1971), American politician, congressman from Ohio
Frazier Reams Jr. (1929–2020), American politician from Ohio, son of Frazier Reams
Harry Reems (1947–2013), American real estate owner and former porn star
Lee Roy Reams (born 1942), American actor, choreographer, and director